Pokrovka is a rural locality (a selo) and the administrative center of Pokrovsky Selsoviet of Akhtubinsky District, Astrakhan Oblast, Russia. The population was 1,070 as of 2010. There are 23 streets.

Geography 
Pokrovka is located 13 km northwest of Akhtubinsk (the district's administrative centre) by road. Akhtubinsk is the nearest rural locality.

References 

Rural localities in Akhtubinsky District